Ben Sirmans (born October 17, 1970) is an American football coach and former running back who is the running backs coach for the Green Bay Packers of the National Football League (NFL).

Raised in East Orange, New Jersey, Sirmans played prep football at Immaculate Conception High School.

Playing career

Sirmans was the starting running back for the Black Bears from 1990 to 1993 playing three of those seasons under coach Kirk Ferentz. During his senior season he ran for over 1,000 yards and earned all-conference and All-New England honors. He graduated from with a degree in physical education, health and recreation.

Coaching career

College
After three years of working as the assistant head coach at Barringer High School in Newark, New Jersey (where he also coached the offense and special teams), Sirmans returned to his alma mater. Between 1996 and 1999 he was the Black Bear's running backs coach and recruiting coordinator under Jack Cosgrove. In 2000 he went to Kent State to be the Golden Flashes’ running backs coach under Dean Pees, and was retained by Doug Martin for the 2004 season. On February 9, 2005 it was announced that Sirmans  would be going to Michigan State to serve as the running backs coach replacing Reggie Mitchell. In 2006 he was given the additional title of special teams coordinator. Sirmans would then go on to  Boston College in 2007 staying there until 2011 as running backs coach. During his time with the Eagles one of the players he recruited was Luke Kuechly. In 2012 it was announced that he was becoming Rutgers running backs coach, however it never came into fruition, because Sirmans made the jump to the NFL.

NFL
In 2012 joined the St. Louis Rams as the team's running backs coach. However he would not make the move to Los Angeles with them as he left the organization after the 2015 season. He was the hired by the Green Bay Packers on February 17, 2016. With the changing of coaching staff he was  retained by Matt LaFleur on January 31, 2019.

Personal life 
Ben is married to Letia Thompson of Akron, Ohio and the couple has a son named Marcus.

References

External links
Green Bay Packers bio

1970 births
African-American coaches of American football
African-American players of American football
American football running backs
Boston College Eagles football coaches
Green Bay Packers coaches
High school football coaches in New Jersey
Kent State Golden Flashes football coaches
Maine Black Bears football coaches
Maine Black Bears football players
Michigan State Spartans football coaches
Sportspeople from East Orange, New Jersey
Players of American football from New Jersey
St. Louis Rams coaches
Living people
21st-century African-American sportspeople
20th-century African-American sportspeople